The Blériot 155 (or Bl-155) was a French airliner of the 1920s. It was a four-engined biplane developed from the Blériot 115 and 135, but larger than these aircraft. Two were built for use by Air Union on their Paris-London route. Both were lost in accidents in 1926.

Records
In 1926, Robert Bajac piloted one of the 155s to break the world absolute aerial duration records for powered aircraft. On 26 March, he stayed aloft 3 hours 46 minutes 35 seconds with a 1,500 kg payload aboard, thereby not only breaking the record for this weight payload, but also the record for 1,000 kg payload. On 24 July, he broke the equivalent record in the 2,000 kg payload class.

Accidents
On 18 August 1926, Blériot 155 F-AIEB Wilbur Wright crashed due to engine failure in bad weather at Hurst, Kent, near Lympne Airport. One crewmember and two of the thirteen passengers aboard were killed.

On 2 October 1926, Blériot 155 F-AICQ Clement Ader of Air Union crashed at Leigh, Kent following an in-flight fire, killing all seven people on board. The pilot was trying to make an emergency landing at Penshurst Airfield.

Variants
Blériot 155
Four-engined airliner.
Blériot 113
Projected bomber version. Not built.

Operators

 Air Union

Specifications

References

Notes

Bibliography
 
 aviafrance.com
 planecrashinfo.com for 1926
 FAI records set with the Blériot 115

155
1920s French airliners
Four-engined tractor aircraft
Aircraft first flown in 1925
Four-engined piston aircraft